Robert Taylor Hesford (13 April 1916 – 15 June 1982) was an English professional footballer who played all his professional career as a goalkeeper for Huddersfield Town.

Biography 
Hesford was born in Bolton. In 1950, Robert was teaching at Spring Grove Junior school in Huddersfield.. He was praised for his sportsmanship and skill in saving a penalty that was retaken at Old Trafford against Manchester United by J.P.W. Mallalieu in the Sporting Manners chapter of his book, Sporting Days

References

1916 births
1982 deaths
Footballers from Bolton
English footballers
English Football League players
Association football goalkeepers
Huddersfield Town A.F.C. players
Stalybridge Celtic F.C. players
FA Cup Final players